Meriwether has been used as both a given name and surname. Notable people with the name include:

Surname
 Chuck Meriwether (1956-2019), American Major League Baseball umpire
 Colyer Meriwether (1858–1920), American historian, educator and writer
 David Meriwether (disambiguation), multiple people, including:
David Meriwether (Georgia politician) (1755–1822), Congressional Representative from Georgia
David Meriwether (Kentucky politician) (1800–1893), Senator from Kentucky and Governor of New Mexico
 Delano Meriwether (born 1943), American doctor and track and field athlete
 Elizabeth Meriwether (born 1981), American playwright and screenwriter
 Elizabeth Avery Meriwether (1824–1916), American author, publisher and activist in the women's suffrage movement
 James Meriwether (1789–1854), American politician and lawyer from Georgia
 James Archibald Meriwether (1806–1852), American politician and lawyer from Georgia
 John Meriwether (born 1947), American hedge fund executive and a pioneer of fixed income arbitrage
 Lee Meriwether (born 1935), American actress who was Miss America 1955
 Lee Meriwether (author) (1862–1966), American author and government official
 Lide Meriwether (1829–1913), American feminist leader and women's rights activist
 Louise Meriwether (born 1923), American novelist, essayist, journalist and activist
 Nana Meriwether (born 1985), American beauty pageant winner who was Miss USA 2012
 Nicholas Meriwether (1665—1744), wealthy land owner of Colony of Virginia
 Porter Meriwether (1940–2009), American basketball player

Given name
 Meriwether Clark (disambiguation), multiple people, including:
Meriwether Lewis Clark Sr. (1809–1879), U.S. Army officer and Confederate general in the American Civil War
Meriwether Lewis Clark Jr. (1846–1899), American businessman and horse racing manager
 Meriwether Lewis (1774–1809), American explorer, soldier, and public administrator
 Meriwether Smith (1730–1790), American planter from Essex County, Virginia
 Meriwether Lewis Walker (1869–1947), Governor of the Panama Canal Zone from 1924 to 1928

See also
 Meriwether (disambiguation)
 Meriweather

English-language surnames